Magnus Haraldsson may refer to: 
 Maccus mac Arailt (fl. 971–974), King of the Isles, also known as Magnus Haraldsson
 Magnus II of Norway (1048–1069), King of Norway, also known as Magnus Haraldsson
 Magnus Haraldsson of Norway (c. 1135 – c. 1145), King of Norway
 Magnus Haraldsson (bishop of Skara), 1522–1529, see Diocese of Skara#History